St. John's Episcopal Church is a church at 185 E. Oak Street in Globe, Arizona, United States.  It was built in 1907 and added to the National Register of Historic Places in 1977.

See also

Globe, Arizona
List of historic properties in Globe, Arizona

References

Churches in Gila County, Arizona
Episcopal church buildings in Arizona
Gothic Revival church buildings in Arizona
Churches on the National Register of Historic Places in Arizona
Churches completed in 1907
National Register of Historic Places in Gila County, Arizona
Buildings and structures in Globe, Arizona
Individually listed contributing properties to historic districts on the National Register in Arizona